
Ägerisee or Lake Aegeri is a glacial lake in the Canton of Zug, Switzerland. The two municipalities along its shore are Oberägeri and Unterägeri. The main tributary is the Hüribach; the Lorze river drains the Ägerisee. Since 1992 the lake has been used as a water reservoir.

The Battle of Morgarten took place in 1315 on the shores of the Ägerisee.

Gallery

See also
 List of lakes of Switzerland

External links

Waterlevels at Unterägeri from the Swiss Federal Office for the Environment

Lakes of Switzerland
Lakes of the canton of Zug
LAgeri
Glacial lakes